Jamie McGuire is an American romance novelist from Oklahoma. She writes primarily in the new adult fiction genre, and became popular with the release of her novel Beautiful Disaster. Several of her books have been self-published.

Biography 
Jamie McGuire was born in Tulsa, Oklahoma, and raised in Blackwell, Oklahoma. McGuire is a 1997 graduate of Blackwell High School. She received further education at Northern Oklahoma College, the University of Central Oklahoma, and Autry Technology Center. She holds an Associate Degree of Applied Science in radiography from Northern Oklahoma College.
Prior to becoming a full-time author she worked for many years as a radiographer. She previously lived in Enid, Oklahoma, and currently resides in Jenks, Oklahoma.  McGuire has two daughters  and a son. In 2019 she went viral for her opinions on vaccinations.

In 2020 she attempted a run as a Republican for the Oklahoma House of Representatives in house district 69, but was disqualified due to residency requirements.

Self-publishing 
McGuire self-published her first four novels, Providence, Requiem, Beautiful Disaster, and Eden. Due to the success of Beautiful Disaster as a New York Times best seller she was offered a publishing contract with Atria Books for the rights to Beautiful Disaster and its sequel, Walking Disaster. Atria Books also published Beautiful Oblivion, Red Hill, and A Beautiful Wedding. Many of her novels have ranked on the New York Times best seller list, including Walking Disaster which also ranked on the USA Today, and Wall Street Journal lists. 

In 2014 McGuire returned to self-publishing for her next novel, Happenstance, because she realized she would make a higher profit by keeping her own digital rights. Since then, with the exception of From Here to You and All the Little Lights in 2018, most of her work has been self-published.

Bibliography

Providence 

 Providence (2010, self-published)
 Requiem (2011, self-published)
 Eden (2012, self-published)

 Sins of the Innocent: A Novella (2015, self-published)
 Sins of the Immortal: A Novella (2021, self-published)

Beautiful 

 Beautiful Disaster (2011, self-published / 2012, Atria Books)
 Walking Disaster (2013, Atria Books)

 "Mrs. Maddox" (2012, self-published, short story)
 A Beautiful Wedding (2013, Atria Books)
 Endlessly Beautiful (Ongoing, self-published, extended chapters)

Maddox Brothers
 Beautiful Oblivion (2014, Atria Books)
 Beautiful Redemption (2015, self-published)
 Beautiful Sacrifice (2015, self-published)
 Beautiful Burn (2016, self-published)
 A Beautiful Funeral (2016, self-published)
 Something Beautiful: A Novella (2015, self-published)

Red Hill
 Red Hill (2013, Atria Books)
 Among Monsters: A Red Hill Novella (2014, self-published)

Happenstance
 Happenstance (2014, self-published)
 Happenstance 2 (2014, self-published)
 Happenstance 3 (2015, self-published)

Crash and Burn
 From Here To You (2018, Forever Romance)
 The Edge of Us (2019, self-published)

Stand alone work
 Apolonia (2014, self-published)
 Sweet Nothing (2015, self-published, co-authored with Teresa Mummert)
 All the Little Lights (2018, Montlake Romance)

References

External links
 

Living people
21st-century American novelists
American romantic fiction writers
American women novelists
21st-century American women writers
Writers from Enid, Oklahoma
Novelists from Oklahoma
1978 births
Northern Oklahoma College alumni
University of Central Oklahoma alumni
Writers from Tulsa, Oklahoma
People from Blackwell, Oklahoma
Oklahoma Republicans